Ulpius Julianus (died 218) was a Censor in 217, Princeps Peregrinorum, and a Praetorian prefect. He may have been loyal to the praetorian prefect Macrinus. Ulpius would have been when he was sent with a cavalry contingent of the third Legion to fight Elagabalus. The cavalry betrayed Macrinus and killed Julianus. Ulpius Julianus' head was presented to Macrinus at dinner.

References 

Roman censors
Date of birth unknown
Place of birth unknown
Place of death unknown
3rd-century Romans
Praetorian prefects
218 deaths